The billiards world rankings are the official system of ranking English billiards players to determine automatic qualification and seeding for tournaments 

The ranking are maintained by the sport's governing body, World Billiards, a subsidiary of the World Professional Billiards and Snooker Association. A player's ranking is based on their performances in designated ranking tournaments over two years, with a season that begins on 1 September, and ends on 31 August of the following year.

As of 2012, the distinction between professional and amateur players was removed. Both male and female players are included on the list.

Top Ranked Players

Notes 
 Gilchrist and Hall were joint 3rd ranked.

References

External links
 World Billiards Current Ranking List
 World Billiards Seeding and Draw System

World Billiards Championship (English billiards)
Competitions in English billiards
World championships in English billiards